"Pistol Packin' Mama" was a "Hillbilly"-Honky Tonk record released at the height of World War II that became a nationwide sensation, and the first "Country" song to top the Billboard popular music chart. It was written by Al Dexter of Troup, Texas, who recorded it in Los Angeles, California on March 20, 1942, with top session musicians Dick Roberts, Johnny Bond and Dick Reinhart, who all normally worked for Gene Autry).

1943 was dominated by the Musician's Strike, which since August 1942, had prevented the recording of commercial music by the record companies. As the strike dragged on, the labels began releasing material from their artists' back catalogues, until by mid-1943, that ran out too. Fortunately for Okeh records, they released Al Dexter's "Pistol Packin' Mama" (PPM), backed with "Rosalita", in March. It caught fire quickly, helped by reports in 'The Billboard' magazine, and great popularity with customers of the nation's jukeboxes, which had run out of fresh material to play. Although Billboard did not publish its first Folk-Hillbilly chart until January 8, 1944, PPM became the first "Hillbilly" record to reach no. 1 on the National Best Selling Retail Records chart, on October 30, 1943, and spent sixteen weeks in the top 10, on its way to selling 3 million copies. It entered the Jukebox chart on July 31, 1943, where it stayed for 28 weeks (the last 14  shared with Bing Crosby version), another unheard of achievement for a "Hillbilly" tune. In Billboard's 1943 Yearbook, released in September, PPM by Dexter was the only hillbilly record to join Glenn Miller and Tommy Dorsey in the best-selling record list.

Top vocalist Bing Crosby, always a major fan of "hillbilly" music, was finally able to record a cover version with the Andrews Sisters on September 27, when his label, Decca, became the first to settle with the union. The single, released October 21, followed Dexter's to the top, revitalizing popularity and sales into 1944. When the first Billboard "Most Played Jukebox Folk Records" chart was published, both PPM versions tied for Number 1, and remained tied for seven straight weeks.

The NBC radio network banned Bing's version because of the line “drinking beer in a cabaret.” The lyrics had to be changed to “singing songs in a cabaret” before it could air.

"Pistol Packin' Mama" Chart performance

Al Dexter and His Troopers

Bing Crosby & Andrews Sisters

Other recordings
 According to the database of secondhandsongs.com, PPM has been recorded by 46 different artists as of July 2021.
The Pied Pipers featuring Jo Stafford with Paul Weston and his orchestra on Capitol Records – 140, recorded September 27, 1943.
Louis Jordan performed a "hillbilly rendition" of the song, which drew laughs, during a November 1943 appearance in a show at the Orpheum Theater in Los Angeles.
Gene Vincent's 1960 version reached No. 15 in the UK charts and featured Georgie Fame on piano.
Peppi Borza performed a cover in 1964 whilst performing in the group Peppi and the New York Twisters.
The Flamin' Groovies did a cover the song on their 1969 debut album Supersnazz.
Stompin' Tom Connors recorded a rendition as the title track for his 1971 album.
Singer/songwriter Hoyt Axton recorded a country version of the song as the title track to his 1982 album.

Other uses
The Irving Berlin song "You Can't Get a Man with a Gun", from the musical Annie Get Your Gun, contains the lyric: "A man's love is mighty, he'll even buy a nightie, for a gal who he thinks is fun. But they don't buy pajamas for pistol packin' mamas."
The chorus of the song was used for the 1970s UK television advertising campaign for Rowntree's Fruit Pastilles, with the punning tag line "Pastille Pickin' Mama, pass those pastilles round."
It is also continually referenced in Spike Milligan's Goodbye Soldier (1986), which is part of his memoirs of World War II and just after it.  In it he states that as Mussolini did not like jazz, after he was defeated the Italians were getting into jazz, and as this song was popular at the time, this was one of the songs Milligan and his group was often asked to sing. He also states that this is one of the main songs sung by Italian jazz bands (in fact he states that some bands only ever sang this song).
There is also a version of the song on an album titled A.P.C. Presents: The Unreleasable Tapes, with Bryan Adams being credited with the lead vocals.
The Bing Crosby and Andrews Sisters version of the song is featured in the video games L.A. Noire and Fallout 4, on radio stations in-game, and in the episode "The Atomic Job" of Agent Carter.
A B17-G Flying Fortress named "Pistol Packin' Mama" was lost on July 20, 1944, on a mission to Leipzig.
In episode #151 of Hee Haw, the whole Hee Haw Gang, led by Buck Owens, performed the song in front of the haystack.
In a 1964 episode of the television program McHale's Navy entitled "The Rage of Taratupa", the song is sung several times by the character Harley Hatfield, played by actor Jesse Pearson.

In popular culture
The Bing Crosby and the Andrews Sisters 1943 version is featured in the Bethesda Softworks video games Fallout 4 and  Fallout 76 on the in-game radio and also featured in the Rockstar Games and Team Bondi video game L.A. Noire.

External links
 Universal Music Digital Music Library

References

1942 songs
1943 singles
1944 singles
Bing Crosby songs
The Andrews Sisters songs
Songs written by Al Dexter
List of Billboard number-one singles of 1943